Abdolhamid Ismaeelzahi is an Iranian Sunni Muslim cleric who is regarded as a "spiritual leader for Iran’s Sunni Muslim population", according to Reuters. Ismaeelzahi, a Baloch, enjoys support of the overwhelming majority of Baloch people in Iran, who hail him as their Molavi.

He is the imam of the Makki Mosque in Zahedan and the director of the Jamiah Darul Uloom Zahedan, the main seminary in the city.

Views
Ismaeelzahi is a vocal critic of the status of freedom of religion in Iran and an advocate of nonviolence. He has stated that capital punishment is "not suitable" and should be "used only when there are no other alternatives".

On 2 August 2017, he sent a letter to Ali Khamenei addressing concerns over the "issue of religious discrimination in Iran", which was publicly replied to.

Relations with Taliban 
He traveled to Chabahar on November 25, 2013, and told the directors of religious schools in Sistan and Baluchistan:

"All these groups are not takfiris. For example, the Taliban group is not takfiri. The differences that we have with the method of their functions will remain, but this group is not takfiri." 

In 2018, Ismaeelzahi issued a statement and considered the signing of the peace agreement between the "Afghan Taliban Movement" and the "American Government" as "a great success of the present era" and an example of "the victory of right over wrong".

In August 2021, Ismaeelzahi said about the Taliban that the vast advances of the Taliban in Afghanistan are the result of God's help and the people's support for them, and the goal of the Taliban is to implement the Islamic law and the way of the Prophet and the decree of God.

Travel restrictions
Ismaeelzahi is under alleged travel restrictions imposed by the establishment. In July 2014, he was barred from leaving the country. In 2017, it was reported that the restriction was intensified, barring him from any travel except to Tehran. However, in December 2018, he was allowed to visit Muscat, Oman to meet the Iranian Baluch minority living there.

Accolades
 Defenders of Human Rights Center's Activist of the Year (2013)

References

External links

Official Instagram

1947 births
Living people
Deobandis
Hanafi fiqh scholars
International Union of Muslim Scholars members
Iranian activists
Iranian Islamic religious leaders
Iranian Sunni Muslims
Nonviolence advocates
People from Zahedan
20th-century Muslim theologians
21st-century Muslim theologians